Alice is a Portuguese film directed by Marco Martins, released in 2005. Alice stars Nuno Lopes as Mário, the father, and Beatriz Batarda as Luísa, his wife, as well as Miguel Guilherme, Ana Bustorff, Gonçalo Waddington, Carla Maciel, Laura Soveral and José Wallenstein. Alice was produced by Paulo Branco. Music is by Bernardo Sassetti.

Shot in a dark, depressive undertone, Alice unveils a Lisbon whose mists, colours, alleys and moods are strangers, despite the familiarity of the locations. All seems odd, silently cruel, as cruel is the disappearance of a child from the path she'd traveled every day in (apparent) safety. The anguish is masterfully conveyed, and so is the loneliness of both parents.

Plot 
It's been 193 days since Alice was last seen. Every day, her father, Mário, leaves home and follows exactly the same route the day Alice disappeared. In his quest, Mário creates a video surveillance network on the places she might walk, the airport, anything that may provide a clue. 

Every day, he watches countless hours of surveillance tapes in fast-forward, expecting to get a glimpse of his child. Almost every day, hope is born. Almost every day, hope is extinguished - until one day, the search seems to be over.

Cast 
Nuno Lopes as Mário
Beatriz Batarda as Luísa
Miguel Guilherme
Ana Bustorff as Margarida
Laura Soveral as Lurdes
Gonçalo Waddington as Airport Security
Carla Maciel as Mónica
José Wallenstein as Detective
Clara Andermatt
Ivo Canelas as Ricardo

Awards 
An internationally acclaimed success, Alice won and received nominations for a number of awards, including:
Cannes Film Festival - Won Directors' Fortnight Best Picture Award 2005.
Cannes Film Festival - Won Jeunes Regards Award 2005.
Berlin International Film Festival - Won Shooting Star Award 2006 (Nuno Lopes).
Las Palmas de Gran Canaria International Film Festival - Won Best Director - 1st work 2006 (Marco Martins).
European Film Awards - Nominated for the Fassbinder Award 2005.
Mar del Plata Film Festival - Won Best Director, Best Filmography and FIPRESCI Prize 2006. Nominated for Best Film.
Raindance Film Festival- Won Best Director - 1st work 2006 (Marco Martins).

Alice was submitted for the 79th Academy Awards (2007) in the category Academy Award for Best Foreign Language Film.

References

External links
 Alice at Cannes (in French).
 Alice at Cinema PTGATE.
 

2005 films
2005 drama films
2000s Portuguese-language films
Films produced by Paulo Branco
Portuguese drama films
Golden Globes (Portugal) winners
Films shot in Portugal
Films directed by Marco Martins